José María del Campo (1826, Monteros, Tucumán Province – April 11, 1884, San Miguel de Tucumán) was an Argentine priest and Unitarian Party leader.

Governors of Tucumán Province
Unitarianists (Argentina)
People from Tucumán Province
1826 births
1884 deaths